Vallejo is a city in Solano County, California and the second largest city in the North Bay region of the Bay Area. Located on the shores of San Pablo Bay, the city had a population of 126,090 at the 2020 census. Vallejo is home to the California Maritime Academy, Touro University California and Six Flags Discovery Kingdom.

Vallejo is named after Mariano Guadalupe Vallejo, the famed Californio general and statesman. The city was founded in 1851 on General Vallejo's Rancho Suscol to serve as the capital city of California, which it served as from 1852 to 1853, when the Californian government moved to neighboring Benicia, named in honor of General Vallejo's wife Benicia Carrillo de Vallejo. The following year in 1854, authorities founded the Mare Island Naval Shipyard, which defined Vallejo's economy until the turn of the 21st century.

History 

Vallejo was once home of the Coastal Miwok as well as Suisunes and other Patwin Native American tribes. There are three confirmed Native American sites located in the rock outcrops in the hills above Blue Rock Springs Park. The California Archaeological Inventory has indicated that the three Indian sites are located on Sulphur Springs Mountain.

Mexican era
The city of Vallejo was once part of the  Rancho Suscol Mexican land grant of 1843 by Governor Manuel Micheltorena to General Mariano Guadalupe Vallejo. The city was named after this Mexican military officer and title holder who was appointed in settling and overseeing the north bay region. General Vallejo was responsible for military peace in the region and founded the pueblo of Sonoma in 1836. In 1846 independence-minded Anglo immigrants rose up against the Mexican government of California in what would be known as the Bear Flag Revolt which resulted in his imprisonment in Sutter's Fort. This was subsequently followed by the annexation of the California Republic to the United States. General Vallejo, though a Mexican army officer, generally acquiesced in the annexation of California to the United States, recognizing the greater resources of the United States and benefits that would bring to California.

Post-Conquest era

Following the American Conquest of California, Vallejo used his significant political influence to become a major force for reconciliation between Californios and Americans. In 1850, Vallejo proposed plans for a new city, to be called Eureka, with the capitol, university, botanical garden and other features. After a statewide referendum, his proposal was accepted, although a new name was decided upon: Vallejo. In 1851, a commission appointed by the Senate found a site on a hill that overlooked the bay and could see San Francisco on a clear day, and it was approved for its symbolic strategic value. 

In 1851, Vallejo was declared to become the official state capitol, with the government prepared to meet for the first time the following year. In 1852, the legislature convened for the first time. Unfortunately, Vallejo didn't follow through with building a capitol for them to meet in. In 1853, it was again the meeting place for the legislature, solely for the purpose of moving the capitol officially to Benicia, which occurred on February 4, 1853, after only a month. Benicia is named after Vallejo's wife, Benicia de Vallejo. After legislature left, the government established a naval shipyard on Mare Island, which helped the city overcome the loss. Due to the presence of the shipyard, Filipinos began to immigrate to Vallejo beginning in the first decades of the 20th century. The yard functioned for over a hundred years, finally closing in 1996.

The U.S. government appointed the influential Vallejo as Indian agent for Northern California. He also served on the state constitutional convention in 1849. Afterward, Vallejo remained active in state politics, but challenges to his land titles around Sonoma eventually left him impoverished and reduced his ranch from 250,000 acres to a mere 300. He eventually retired from public life, questioning the wisdom of his having welcomed the American acquisition of California in the first place. Vallejo died in 1890, a symbol of the eclipse of Californio wealth, power, and prestige.

Although the town is named after General Vallejo, the man regarded as the true founder of Vallejo is John B. Frisbie. After his daughter Epifania married Frisbie, General Vallejo granted him power of attorney for the land grant. It was Frisbie who hired E.H. Rowe, the man who designed the city layout and who named the east–west streets after states and the north–south streets after California counties.

Modern era

In the early 1900s, Vallejo was home to a Class D minor-league baseball team, referred to in local newspapers sometimes as the "Giants" and other times simply as "The Vallejos." Pacific Coast League star and future Chicago White Sox center fielder Ping Bodie played for Vallejo during the 1908 season, in which the team reached the California state title game. The team was disbanded in the early 1920s. Today it is home to the Vallejo Admirals of the independent Pacific Association.

Mare Island Naval Shipyard was a critical submarine facility during WW II, both for constructing and overhauling vessels.

Downtown Vallejo retains many of its historic Victorian and Craftsman homes.

The Zodiac Killer was a serial killer who was active in Northern California during the 1960s. He claimed to have killed 37, but the actual number is unknown. Three of the murders attributed to the Zodiac Killer took place within the city limits or nearby. Both the Vallejo Police Department and San Francisco Police Department investigated the murders but were never able to solve the case. The case was marked inactive in April 2004 but was reopened in March 2007. The Vallejo Police Department website has a menu tab for providing Zodiac Crime Tips. The case also remains open in additional jurisdictions.

Geography 

The Napa River flows until it changes into the Mare Island Strait in Vallejo which then flows into San Pablo Bay, in the northeastern part of San Francisco Bay.

Vallejo is located on the southwestern edge of Solano County, California in the North Bay region of the San Francisco Bay Area in Northern California. Vallejo borders the city of Benicia to the east, American Canyon and the Napa county line to the north, the Carquinez Strait to the south and the San Pablo Bay to the west.

Several faults have been mapped in the vicinity of Vallejo. The San Andreas Fault and Hayward Faults are the most active faults, although the San Andreas is at some distance. Locally, the Sulphur Springs Valley Thrust Fault and Southampton Fault are found. No quaternary seismic activity along these minor faults has been observed with the possible exception of a slight offset revealed by trenching. The Sulphur Mountain and Green Valley faults have been associated with the Concord Fault to the south. The Concord Fault is considered active. 

Historically there have been local cinnabar mines in the Vallejo area.  The Hastings Mine and St. John's Mine contribute ongoing water contamination for mercury; furthermore, mine shaft development has depleted much of this area's spring water. Both Rindler Creek and Blue Rock Springs Creek have been affected.

Climate 
Vallejo has a mild, coastal Mediterranean climate and can be an average of 10 °F (6 °C) cooler than nearby inland cities. Vallejo is influenced by its position on the northeastern shore of San Pablo Bay, but is less sheltered from heatwaves than areas directly on or nearer the Pacific Ocean/Golden Gate such as San Francisco and Oakland. However, summer is very long with June–September being almost equal in historical average temperatures. This seasonal lag sees October averages being higher than in May in spite of it being after the Equinox (meaning less daylight than darkness).

Demographics 

Vallejo was named the most diverse city in the United States in a 2012 study by Brown University based on 2010 census data, and the most diverse city in the state of California by a Niche study based on 2017 American Community Survey data. In 2022, Vallejo was again named the most diverse small town in America, with a 77% chance any two residents would be of a different census racial category

2020 census

Note: the US Census treats Hispanic/Latino as an ethnic category. This table excludes Latinos from the racial categories and assigns them to a separate category. Hispanics/Latinos can be of any race.

2010 

The 2010 United States Census reported that Vallejo had a population of 115,942. The racial makeup of Vallejo was 38,066 (32.9%) White, 25,572 (22.1%) African American, 757 (0.7%) Native American, 28,895 (24.9%) Asian (21.1% Filipino, 1.0% Indian, 0.9% Chinese, 0.5% Vietnamese, 0.2% Japanese, 0.2% Korean, 0.1% Laotian), 1,239 (1.1%) Pacific Islander, 12,759 (11.0%) from other races, and 8,656 (7.5%) from two or more races. Hispanic or Latino of any race were 26,165 persons (22.6%). Non-Hispanic Whites numbered 28,946 persons (25.0%).

The Census reported that 114,279 people (98.6% of the population) lived in households, 1,130 (1.0%) lived in non-institutionalized group quarters, and 533 (0.5%) were institutionalized.

There were 40,559 households, out of which 14,398 (35.5%) had children under the age of 18 living in them, 17,819 (43.9%) were opposite-sex married couples living together, 7,214 (17.8%) had a female householder with no husband present, 2,755 (6.8%) had a male householder with no wife present. There were 2,804 (6.9%) unmarried opposite-sex partnerships, and 497 (1.2%) same-sex married couples or partnerships. 9,870 households (24.3%) were made up of individuals, and 3,255 (8.0%) had someone living alone who was 65 years of age or older. The average household size was 2.82. There were 27,788 families (68.5% of all households); the average family size was 3.36.

The population was spread out, with 26,911 people (23.2%) under the age of 18, 11, 69 people (10.1%) aged 18 to 24, 30,053 people (25.9%) aged 25 to 44, 33,312 people (28.7%) aged 45 to 64, and 13,999 people (12.1%) who were 65 years of age or older. The median age was 37.9 years. For every 100 females, there were 94.3 males. For every 100 females age 18 and over, there were 91.4 males.

The homeowner vacancy rate was 3.0%; the rental vacancy rate was 9.4%. 68,236 people (58.9% of the population) lived in owner-occupied housing units and 46,043 people (39.7%) lived in rental housing units.

2000 

As of the census of 2000, there were 116,760 people, 39,601 households, and 28,235 families residing in the city. The population density was 1,493.3/km2 (3,867.9/mi2). There were 41,219 housing units at an average density of 527.2/km2 (1,365.4/mi2). The racial makeup of the city was 35.97% White, 23.69% African American, 0.66% Native American, 24.16% Asian, 1.09% Pacific Islander, 7.88% from other races, and 6.56% from two or more races. Hispanic or Latino of any race were 15.92% of the population.

As of 2000, residents with Filipino ancestry made up 20.74% of Vallejo's population.  As of 2009, Vallejo is the 9th largest city in the San Francisco Bay Area, 48th in the state of California, and 215th in the U.S. by population.

There were 39,601 households, out of which 36.5% had children under the age of 18 living with them, 49.1% were married couples living together, 16.5% had a female householder with no husband present, and 28.7% were non-families. 22.7% of all households were made up of individuals, and 8.0% had someone living alone who was 65 years of age or older. The average household size was 2.90 and the average family size was 3.43.

In the city, the population was spread out, with 27.6% under the age of 18, 9.0% from 18 to 24, 29.6% from 25 to 44, 22.6% from 45 to 64, and 11.2% who were 65 years of age or older. The median age was 35 years. For every 100 females, there were 93.9 males. For every 100 females age 18 and over, there were 89.7 males.

The median income for a household in the city was $47,030, and the median income for a family was $53,805. Males had a median income of $40,132 versus $32,129 for females. The per capita income for the city was $20,415. About 7.7% of families and 10.1% of the population were below the poverty line, including 12.2% of those under age 18 and 8.9% of those age 64 or over.

Economy 

As the largest city in the North Bay region of the Bay Area, Vallejo is a regional economic hub for the North Bay and specifically Solano County.

Top employers
According to the city's 2021 Comprehensive Annual Financial Report, the top employers in the city are:

Arts and culture

In recent years, Vallejo has attracted a large community of artists to the region in search of lower rent and larger work-spaces. Artists pushed out of larger Bay Area cities like San Francisco and Oakland have been working with city leaders to revitalize the once blighted downtown area.

The artist-run Vallejo Art Walk scheduled on the second Friday of every month in downtown Vallejo has been recognized as a hub for artists in the Bay Area and the entirety of California.

LGBT community 
As early as the 1940s and before, Vallejo is known to have had a well-formed gay community, which was a short drive or boat ride away from San Francisco. At one time Vallejo boasted eight gay bars. After a migration of gays and lesbians from San Francisco in the decade 2000–2009, openly gay members of the community encountered what they described as a backlash against them. The school district was threatened by the ACLU to be sued for harassment of a 17-year-old lesbian by school administrators. The school settled the lawsuit with the student. The school agreed to pay her $25,000, adopt a more stringent non-discrimination policy and include a curriculum that positively portrayed gay and lesbian people.

Government 

The Government of Vallejo is defined under the Charter of the City of Vallejo. It is a council–manager government and consists of the Mayor, City Council, and numerous departments and officers under the supervision of the City Manager, such as the Vallejo Police Department, Vallejo Fire Department, Vallejo Public Works Department, and Vallejo Economic Development Department. As of February 2023, the council consists of Robert McConnell (Mayor), Rozanna Verder-Aliga (Vice Mayor), Diosdado "JR" Matulac, Mina Loera-Diaz, Charles Palmares, Peter Bregenzer, and Cristina Arriola.

On May 6, 2008, the City Council voted 7–0 to file for Chapter 9 bankruptcy, at the time becoming the largest California city to do so. Stephanie Gomes, Vallejo City Councilwoman, largely blames exorbitant salaries and benefits for Vallejo firefighters and police officers. Reportedly, salaries and benefits for public safety workers account for at least 80 percent of Vallejo's general-fund budget. On November 1, 2011, a federal judge released Vallejo from bankruptcy after nearly three years.

Residents of Vallejo participate in elections for the Solano County Board of Supervisors districts 1 and 2. As of January 2013, these were represented by Supervisors Erin Hannigan and Linda Seifert.

Participatory budgeting 
On April 17, 2012, the City Council approved the first citywide participatory budgeting (PB) process in the United States. The Council allocated $3.4 million to the Vallejo PB process and since then, Vallejo residents and business and property owners have been developing and designing project ideas. They have vetted and reduced more than 800 project ideas to 36 projects that will be on the ballot. Vallejo residents 14 years of age and older will vote and choose six out of 36 projects to vote on from May 11 through May 18, 2013.

The second cycle of participatory budgeting in Vallejo was initiated on February 4, 2014, with $2.4 million allocated. A public vote open to all residents of Vallejo age 16 and over took place in October 2014.

Police

Vallejo has seen a rate of killings by police officers that is significantly higher than the national average and other Bay Area cities. These incidents included the fatal shooting of Willie McCoy by six officers in 2019 and the shooting of Sean Monterrosa, who was unarmed, during protests following the murder of George Floyd in 2020. One of the officers who killed McCoy had previously killed an unarmed man as he fled, while another killed three men over a five-month period and was later promoted. Vallejo Police killed 19 people between 2010 and 2020. In 2012, police shootings accounted for six of the 20 homicides to occur in the city, and the frequency of officer-involved shootings stood at around 38 times the national rate.

Education 

Public high schools in Vallejo include Vallejo High School and Jesse Bethel High School.

Notable private schools in the city include St. Catherine of Siena School, St. Patrick-St. Vincent High School, and the Starting Gate School.

Universities and colleges 
California Maritime Academy (part of the CSU system)
Solano Community College – Vallejo
Touro University California

Transportation 

Vallejo's public transit includes the San Francisco Bay Ferry, which regularly runs from downtown Vallejo to the San Francisco Ferry Building. SolTrans buses carry passengers around the cities of Vallejo and Benicia, as well as offer express services to Fairfield, California, and Bay Area Rapid Transit stations in El Cerrito, California and Walnut Creek, California. Evans Transportation buses provide daily service to Oakland International Airport from a Courtyard by Marriott hotel adjacent to Six Flags Discovery Kingdom.

Vallejo is accessible by Interstate 80 between San Francisco and Sacramento, and is the location for the northern half of the Carquinez Bridge. It is also accessible by Interstate 780 from neighboring Benicia to the east, and by Route 37 from Marin County to the west. Route 29 (former U.S. Route 40) begins in the city near the Carquinez Bridge and travels north through the heart of the city and beyond into Napa County.

Media 

The principal local newspaper is the Vallejo Times Herald. The community is also served by the Vallejo Independent Bulletin and by Vallejo Community Access Television (VCAT 27).

Open Vallejo is an independent, nonprofit public interest newsroom primarily focused on investigative and explanatory reporting.

The Vallejo Sun is an independent, for-profit newsletter and website that serves Vallejo and Solano County with city, police, housing, education and events coverage.

Local radio broadcast stations include KZCT 89.5 FM community radio station and KDIA/KDYA Christian radio stations

Sister cities 
Vallejo has six sister cities:

Notable people

See also 

 List of cities and towns in California
 List of cities and towns in the San Francisco Bay Area
 USS Vallejo, 3 ships

References 

Vallejo Choral Society, a local arts non-profit founded in 1917

External links 

 

 Historical photographs of Vallejo, ca. 1865-ca. 1910, The Bancroft Library

 
1868 establishments in California
Cities in Solano County, California
Cities in the San Francisco Bay Area
California
Government units that have filed for Chapter 9 bankruptcy
Incorporated cities and towns in California
Populated places established in 1868
Populated coastal places in California